The  is the 45th edition of the Japan Academy Film Prize, an award presented by the Nippon Academy-Sho Association to award excellence in filmmaking.

Winners and nominees

Awards

References

External links 
  

Japan Academy Prize
2021 in Japanese cinema
Japan Academy Film Prize
March 2022 events in Japan